Françoise Denise Aline Blanchard (6 June 1954 – 24 May 2013) was a French actress and voice dubbing artist. Her most notable work is that of her role in the 1982 French film La morte vivante, directed by Jean Rollin. Blanchard had collaborated with Rollin on several occasions in films Les trottoirs de Bangkok (1984), À la poursuite de Barbara (1991) and La nuit des horloges (2007). She had worked frequently with directors Richard Balducci and Jesús Franco. She was also known for her work as a voice artist, having dubbed films, such as, Robert Altman's Popeye (1980), The NeverEnding Story III (1994) and Hackers (1995), and animated television series, Teenage Mutant Ninja Turtles and Totally Spies!

Career
Blanchard's career stretched from between the late 1970s until the early 1990s. She may have been best known for playing Catherine Valmont in 1982 horror La Morte Vivante (The Living Dead Girl), a film from Jean Rollin.

She also appeared in films by directors Jess Franco and Bruno Mattei. She recalled her career in an interview, which was featured on the Encore release of La Morte Vivante, she mentioned that it was a tragedy and a coincidence that started her career in the late 1970s. While trying to make ends meet as a hand model, she lost her brother in the late 1970. Around that same time she was offered her first role, coincidentally as someone who had also lost a family member. Françoise approached the part skeptically as she remembered that at that time she was, "aggressive against people but also a bit confused" due to the death of her brother. She enjoyed the experience and took a serious interest in acting, so decided to take acting lessons afterwards.

Blanchard soon became involved in several B movies when her career quickly became intertwined with the legendary Eurocine company. "I liked the feel of these B movies, especially horror", Françoise noted to Encore, which perhaps explains why she became so popular to several of the most noteworthy genre directors of the late 1970s. She also mentioned that she didn't mind nudity and even went so far as to pose for Lui Magazine in the early 1980s. After several films directors such as Pierre Chevalier, Françoise took a role in Bruno Mattei's Caligula and Messalina in 1981. The following year she appeared in Jess Franco's Revenge In The House Of Usher, and she liked Franco and admired his creativity and fire.

She then appeared in the La Morte Vivante with Rollin. The night shoot on the film was mostly difficult and there were many problems with the special effects but, despite some disagreements, she liked and admired Rollin and admitted to Encore that, "he is really nice and is very much there". She enjoyed working with and admired her co-star in the film, Italian actress Marina Pierro, and noted, "she is very maternal with me." Françoise worked again with Rollin in Les Trottoirs De Bangkok (The Sidewalks Of Bangkok), a film which she had a lot of fun making, and she appeared in his newest film production La nuit des horloges (The Night of Clocks) opposite Ovidie.

Death
Blanchard died on 24 May 2013, twelve days before her 59th birthday. The cause of death was not disclosed.

Filmography

References

External links
 
 
 
 Françoise Blanchard at MUBI

1954 births
2013 deaths
French actresses
French film actresses
French television actresses
French voice actresses
People from Saint-Mandé
20th-century French actresses